Fighter Squadron 191 or VF-191 was a short-lived aviation unit of the United States Navy established on 1 December 1986 and disestablished on 30 April 1988. It was the second US Navy squadron to be designated VF-191.  VF-191 and sister squadron VF-194 were the two shortest-lived F-14 squadrons in history.

Operational history

VF-191 adopted the unit name and insignia of the original VF-191. After training on the F-14A Tomcat with VF-124, and being due to deploy on board  as part of Carrier Air Wing 10, VF-191 was disestablished on 30 April 1988, before the cruise could take place.

Home port assignments
NAS Miramar Field

Aircraft assignment
F-14A Tomcat

See also
History of the United States Navy
List of inactive United States Navy aircraft squadrons
List of United States Navy aircraft squadrons

References

External links

Strike fighter squadrons of the United States Navy